Miaschistopus is a genus of spiders in the family Theraphosidae. It was first described in 1897 by Pocock. , it contains only one species, Miaschistopus tetricus, from Venezuela.

References

Theraphosidae
Monotypic Theraphosidae genera
Spiders of South America